Domenico Giampà (born 15 February 1977) is an Italian association football coach and former midfielder.

Playing career
A versatile central midfielder, Giampà started his career with Catanzaro. In 2004 he won his first Serie A promotion with Sicilian club Messina, doing his top flight debut in the following 2004–05 Serie A season.

Giampà successively made nationwide news after sustaining a serious injury during a Serie A game against Lecce, during which he got a severe leg injury while crashing against a billboard that required to be sutured with a total of 147 stitches.

In January 2006 he moved to another Serie A club, Ascoli.

Giampà retired from active football in 2016 following two seasons back at Catanzaro.

Coaching career
In 2017–18, Giampà served as head coach of Calabrian amateurs Roccella. Successively he became a youth coach at Catanzaro for the 2019–20 season.

On 8 January 2021 he moved back to Sicily, becoming the new head coach of Serie D club Sant'Agata.

References

External links
Profile at Lega-Calcio.it

Living people
Italian footballers
Italian football managers
U.S. Catanzaro 1929 players
A.C.R. Messina players
Ascoli Calcio 1898 F.C. players
Modena F.C. players
S.S.D. Lucchese 1905 players
U.S. Salernitana 1919 players
F.C. Crotone players
Ternana Calcio players
Vigor Lamezia players
1977 births
Association football midfielders